The Mayor of Selwyn is the head of the municipal government of Selwyn District in New Zealand's South Island. The mayor is directly elected using a first-past-the-post electoral system. The immediate past mayor, Kelvin Coe, did not stand for re-election in the 2016 New Zealand local elections. The district's fifth mayor, Sam Broughton, was elected on 8 October 2016 in the 2016 New Zealand local elections. The longest-serving mayor was Michael McEvedy, serving for twelve years.

History
Selwyn District was established as part of the 1989 local government reforms. It was formed from Ellesmere County, Malvern County, and part of Paparua County. 

The first mayor, Anne Hurford, is from an old Ellesmere farming family. The second mayor, Bill Woods, also held the mayoralty for one term (1992–1995). Woods is a perennial candidate and once stated to be "addicted" to elections; he is one of five candidates in the 2016 mayoral election. Michael McEvedy was mayor for four terms from 1995 to 2007, when he retired. 

At the 2007 election, Kelvin Coe took over from McEvedy, being successful against four other candidates. 

At the 2010 election, Coe defended himself against a challenge by former mayor Woods. 

At the 2013 election, there were six candidates for the mayoralty (including former mayor Woods and then-future mayor Broughton), but Coe remained successful. 

During the 2016 election, Coe stood down (after serving three terms) and five candidates contested the election, including former mayor Woods. Sam Broughton was elected and at the time, became one of the country's youngest mayors ever at the age of 35. 

At the 2019 election, Broughton won his second term as mayor, contesting against former mayor Woods. 

At the 2022 election, Sam Broughton won a third term in office, running against Calvin Payne and former mayor Woods.

List of mayors of Selwyn
Selwyn has had five mayors.

Timeline

References

 
Selwyn